Unrecognized villages may refer to:

 Unrecognized Bedouin villages in Israel
 Unrecognized communities of Alaska Native tribes

See also
 Unrecognized ethnic groups in China
 List of unrecognized ethnic groups of Guizhou
 State-recognized tribes
 List of unrecognized tribes in the United States
 Unrecognized state (disambiguation)